Bogdan Potekhin (born July 10, 1992) is a Russian professional ice hockey player. He is currently an unrestricted free agent who most notably played with Metallurg Magnitogorsk in the Kontinental Hockey League (KHL).

Potekhin scored the winning goal to secure the 2010 Kharlamov Cup for the Steel Foxes.

Awards and honors

References

External links

1992 births
Living people
Amur Khabarovsk players
Metallurg Magnitogorsk players
People from Magnitogorsk
Russian ice hockey forwards
Stalnye Lisy players
HC Vityaz players
Yuzhny Ural Orsk players
Sportspeople from Chelyabinsk Oblast